Sororicide (from Latin soror "sister" + -cide, from caedere "to cut, to kill") is the act of killing one's own sister.

There are a number of examples of sororicide and fratricide in adolescents, even pre-adolescents, where sibling rivalry and resulting physical aggression can get out of hand and lead to the death of one of them, particularly when a potent weapon is available or one is significantly older than the other and misjudges their own strength.

Known or suspected examples
 Berenice IV of Egypt is believed to have poisoned her sister Cleopatra VI Tryphaena in 57 BC. She was later beheaded on the orders of her father, Ptolemy XII.
 Cleopatra VII of Egypt requested the execution of her sister, Arsinoe IV, (who was guilty of treason) which was carried out under the orders of her husband, then lover, Mark Antony, in 41 BC.
 Roman emperor Caligula, according to historian Suetonius, killed his sister Drusilla after learning that she was pregnant with his child in AD 38. Most historians now believe that she probably died of fever.
 Roman emperor Commodus ordered his older sister Lucilla to be put to death in AD 182, after she was implicated in plots with members of the Senate to overthrow him.
 Italian poet Isabella di Morra was killed by her brothers around 1546 for a suspected affair with a married nobleman, whom they also murdered.
 Ronald DeFeo Jr. shot his two sisters, Allison and Dawn, in 1974. Their murders became the inspiration for the Amityville Horror books and films.
 David Brom murdered his sister with an ax, alongside his brother, mother, and father in 1988.
 Canadian serial killers Karla Homolka and Paul Bernardo raped, then killed Karla's sister Tammy Homolka in 1990; allegedly, the killing was accidental.
Martin Peyerl killed his sister Daniela in the Bad Reichenhall Shooting's.
 Hatun Sürücü was murdered by her brother in Germany in 2005.
 Yuki Muto murdered his sister Azumi Muto on December 30, 2006 in Japan.
 Sadia Sheikh was murdered by her brother in 2007 in Belgium.
 Aqsa Parvez was murdered by her brother in 2007 in Canada.
 Morsal Obeidi was murdered by her brother in 2008 in Germany.
 Saima Khan, a 34-year-old carer and mother of three, was killed by her 27-year-old sister, Sabah Khan, on 23 May 2016 in Luton, Bedfordshire.

In fiction

Mythology
 The story of the Horatii involves a sororicide: after a set of Roman triplets, the Horatii, defeat a set of Alba Longan triplets, the Curiatii, in single combat to keep Rome from Alba Longan rule, the Horatii's sister was killed by the surviving Horatius for mourning the death of one of the Curiatii, to whom she was engaged. The Roman courts condemned the Horatius to death for the murder despite his service, and it was only his father's appeal to the people that saved him.

Literature
 In William Shakespeare's King Lear, Goneril poisons her sister Regan in their struggle for power.
 In Raymond Carver's Furious Seasons, Lew Farrell kills his sister, Iris, after learning she is pregnant as a result of their incestual relationship.

Anime
 In the manga series Reiko the Zombie Shop, the main antagonist Riruka attempts to kill her sister Reiko out of jealousy over Reiko gaining the responsibility of inheriting their family's title of the "Zombie Shop".
 In the anime Blood+, Chiropterans have a biological hive system. Two twin Queens are always born from cocoons in one of the preceding Queen's womb. When the blood of one Queen mixes with her sister's, it violently crystallizes. In Blood+, Saya kills her twin sister Diva in a 123-year-old war between them.
 In the anime Death Note, Light Yagami considers killing his sister, Sayu when she ends up being captured by Mello and his gang in an attempt to retrieve the titular Death Note.
 In the anime Code Geass, Lelouch Lamperouge kills his half-sister Euphemia li Britannia in order to stop a massacre that he accidentally ordered her to start.
 In the Angel Sanctuary OVA, Rosiel is shown happily saying he will murder Alexiel, who is currently inhabiting Setsuna's body, if she does not return his love.
 in the anime Akame ga Kill!, the two sisters Akame and Kurome spend most of the series trying or plotting to kill each other.
 In the anime Case Closed (Detective Conan), specifically episodes 128–129 "The Forgotten Bond Parts 1 and 2", Maya Garrett (Mina Aoshima) apparently tapes herself inside a bathroom and slits her own wrist. Heavy suspicion comes down on Mindy Garrett (Masayo Aoshima), the victim's older sister, who is seen hysterically laughing over Maya's death.

Films
 In the Halloween film series, serial killer Michael Myers relentlessly pursues and slays both his older sister, Judith Myers in the first movie and its remake, and his younger sister, Laurie Strode in the eighth movie.
 In the 1962 movie What Ever Happened to Baby Jane? (as well as the 1991 TV movie What Ever Happened to Baby Jane?), sisters Blanche and Jane mistreat and attempt to kill each other out of jealousy and hatred.
 In the 1993 film Jason Goes to Hell: The Final Friday, while possessing Creighton Duke's body he warns Diana that mass murderer Jason Voorhees will come to get her and her daughter Jessica. Indeed, after transferring to Josh's body Jason kills his half-sister Diana Kimble with a knife on her back.
 In the 1993 movie The Good Son, Henry Evans tries to kill his younger sister, Connie.
 In the 2002 movie Chicago, Velma Kelly kills her husband and sister after she sees them "doing the Spread Eagle".
 In the horror film Catacombs, a deranged Victoria kills her sister Carolyn in a rage after being yelled at over the accidental killing of Jean-Michael.
 In the 2000 movie Scary Movie Doofy Gilmore, as Ghostface, decapitates his sister Buffy with a cleaver he hid in his cloak.
 In The Evil Dead, Ash Williams killed his sister by burning the book.
 In Frozen, Elsa almost killed her sister Anna as a result of striking her with her ice powers in the head while playing as children. Years later, she does it again when in a bout of panic, this time she accidentally strikes her sister in the heart, causing the latter to freeze painfully from the inside out until she ultimately becomes a solid block of ice and revived seconds later with her sister's love toward the end of the movie.
 In the 2016 film A Wedding, the main character, Zahira Kazim, is murdered by her brother Amir, in an honor killing, after she walks out of a forced marriage.

Songs
 In Child Ballad #10, "The Twa Sisters", or "The Dreadful Wind and Rain", the older sister murders the younger sister over the love of a man, and the younger sister's bones are found by a wandering musician who makes an instrument (either a harp or a fiddle, depending on the version) out of them and strings it with her hair.  The instrument then tells the story of how she died, usually resulting in a gruesome death for the older sister.
 In 2017, Indie Pop Artist, Raffaella created and released her single titled "Sororicide". Her Music video was released in March 2018, wherein she depicts sororicide in a scene where her supposed sister walks around the library with a book called Please Kill Me and she kills her in the end.

Video Games
 In Banjo-Tooie, Gruntilda the witch kills her two sisters Mingella and Blobbella when they lose the Tower Of Tragedy quiz to Banjo and Kazooie.
 In the God of War video game series, Kratos accidentally murders Athena, where he learns she's Kratos's half-sister because it was revealed that Zeus is his birth father.
 In No More Heroes, Travis Touchdown kills his half-sister Jeane to avenge the death of his family, an event Jeane herself was responsible for.
 In Phoenix Wright: Ace Attorney − Trials and Tribulations, Dahlia Hawthorne kills her stepsister Valerie Hawthorne in the fourth case of the game when Valerie threatened to expose the truth behind a fake kidnapping that Dahlia and her boyfriend plotted five years ago in order to steal a rare diamond. Also, the second case of the series's first game sees Maya Fey, assistant of the titular protagonist, accused of sororicide.
 In one of the endings of the video game Trapt, Allura kills her half-sister, Rachel, for the final sacrifice to revive Malphas after becoming possessed by the aforementioned demon. Also, Finnegan kills his older sister Ada in an act of betrayal after being corrupted by the desire to obtain Allura's power for himself.
 In the Tekken series, Nina and Anna Williams are assassins and sisters who have an immensely bitter, sororicidal sibling rivalry.
 In Fable and Fable: The Lost Chapters, after defeating Jack of Blades, the Hero is faced with the option of killing his sister Theresa and receiving the Sword of Aeons, or tossing the sword into the vortex and ridding the world of its evil forever.
 In Dragon Age II depending on player's decisions, Fenris can kill his sister Varania for her treason by helping his master Danarius to capture him for becoming his pupil.
 In Fatal Frame II: Crimson Butterfly, the village forces twin sisters to partake in a ritual in which one sister strangles the other. In the canonical "bad ending", Mio Amakura does indeed strangle her twin sister Mayu to death (the other documented instance of sororicide is when Azami Kiryu kills her sister Akane).
 In Tom Clancy's Rainbow Six Siege you are able to either kill Ela Bosak as Zofia Bosak or vice versa. Doing this rewards the player with extra points for sister rivalry.
 In Aqua's scenario in Kingdom Hearts Birth by Sleep, after Cinderella tries on the glass slipper and wins the Prince's hand in marriage, she gets attacked by an Unversed called the Cursed Coach, which is summoned by her sociopathic stepsisters out of hatred and rage. Thanks to Aqua's interference, Cinderella survives unharmed; the stepsisters are incinerated alive by the Coach in front of her, which Aqua points out was because their wickedness "overtook them".

Soap operas
 In the BBC One soap opera EastEnders (2014), Lucy Beale (Hetti Bywater) was murdered by her younger half-brother Bobby Beale (Eliot Carrington).
 In EastEnders (2016), Gavin Sullivan (Paul Nicholas) killed his sister Margaret Midhurst (Jan Harvey) by pushing her over a balcony during a scuffle.

Television
 In the Netflix series Orange Is the New Black, Barbara and Carol Denning murdered their younger sister, Debbie Denning, by trapping her in an automobile and pushing it into a lake.
 In the Netflix series Chilling Adventures of Sabrina, Zelda Spellman repeatedly kills and resurrects her sister Hilda Spellman.
 In the BBC America Series Orphan Black, Helena kills several of her Leda clone sisters.
 In the Netflix series Lucifer, the archangel Michael eradicates his sister Remiel with Azrael's blade upon discovering she was a spy acting under the orders of their brother and Michael's twin, Lucifer Morningstar.

See also 
 Infanticide, killing of an infant under the age of one year
 Filicide, the killing of a child by his or her parent
 Avunculicide, the killing of one's uncle
 Mariticide, the killing of one's spouse
 Nepoticide, the killing of one's nephew
 Parricide, the killing of one's parents or another close relative
 Patricide and matricide, the killing of a father or mother respectively by his or her child
 Prolicide, is the killing of one's offspring
 Uxoricide, the killing of one's wife
 Fratricide, the killing of one's brother

References

Killings by type
 
Femicide
Sibling rivalry